Sipalolasma is a genus of brushed trapdoor spiders first described by Eugène Simon in 1892. It is restricted to South Asia and parts of Africa.

Species
 it contains nine species:
Sipalolasma aedificatrix Abraham, 1924 – Malaysia
Sipalolasma arthrapophysis (Gravely, 1915) – India
Sipalolasma bicalcarata (Simon, 1904) – Ethiopia
Sipalolasma ellioti Simon, 1892 (type) – Sri Lanka
Sipalolasma greeni Pocock, 1900 – Sri Lanka
Sipalolasma humicola (Benoit, 1965) – Mozambique
Sipalolasma kissi Benoit, 1966 – Congo
Sipalolasma ophiriensis Abraham, 1924 – Malaysia
Sipalolasma warnantae Benoit, 1966 – Congo

References 

Barychelidae
Mygalomorphae genera
Spiders of Africa
Spiders of Asia
Taxa named by Eugène Simon